Kruger 60 (DO Cephei) is a binary star system located 13.15 light-years from the Sun. These red dwarf stars orbit each other every 44.6 years.

Description
The larger, primary star is designated component A, while the secondary, smaller star is labeled component B. Component A has about 27% of the Sun's mass and 35% of the Sun's radius. Component B has about 18% of the Sun's mass and 24% of the Sun's radius. Component B is a flare star and has been given the variable star designation "DO Cephei". It is an irregular flare that typically doubles in brightness and then returns to normal over an 8-minute period.

On average, the two stars are separated by 9.5 AUs, which is roughly the average distance of Saturn from the Sun.  However, their eccentric mutual orbit causes their distance to vary between 5.5 AUs at periastron, to 13.5 at apastron.

This system is orbiting through the Milky Way at a distance from the core that varies from 7–9 kpc with an orbital eccentricity of 0.126–0.130. The closest approach to the Sun will occur in about 88,600 years when this system will come within 1.95 parsecs.

Considering the orbit of the members of Kruger 60, detecting an exoplanet through radial velocity could prove difficult, as its orbit would be inclined only 13 degrees from our point of view, and create 1/5th as strong a radial velocity signal as an exoplanet orbiting edge-on from the point of view of the Solar System.

Origin of 2I/Borisov 

Kruger 60 has been proposed as the origin of interstellar comet  2I/Borisov (formerly named C/2019 Q4 (Borisov)) by Dybczyński, Królikowska, and Wysoczańska. These authors have from other work a list of stars and stellar systems that can potentially act as perturbers of the Oort cloud comets, and searched it for a past close proximity of 2I/Borisov at a very small relative velocity.  While hampered by continuing uncertainty about the orbit of 2I/Borisov and particularly its non-gravitational acceleration (due to cometary outgassing), they reach a conclusion that 1 Myr ago 2I/Borisov passed Kruger 60 at a small distance of 1.74 pc while having an extremely small relative velocity of 3.43 km/s. Perturbations of the 2I/Borisov's incoming orbit altered the intersection distance with relatively small changes in the relative velocity. At the time of publication, the results were considered preliminary as the orbit of 2I/Borisov was still being improved by new observations.

See also
List of nearest stars

References

Further reading

External links
Hires LRGB CCD Image

Cepheus (constellation)
Local Bubble
M-type main-sequence stars
Flare stars
Binary stars
239960
110893
0860
BD+56 2783
Cephei, DO